MgO2 may refer to:

Magnesium peroxide